Olof Mörck (born 12 December 1981) is a Swedish musician who is the guitarist and one of the songwriters of the metal band Amaranthe, as well as guitarist of the power metal band Dragonland. He was also a member of Nightrage between 2006 and 2011 as a guitarist. Notably, he has provided two guitar solos for the 2009 album The Isolation Game by the Italian melodic death metal band Disarmonia Mundi.

In 2010, My Darling Dismay released a video of a song with the same title. The song is more of a rock style than his previous metal projects.

Mörck appears on the 2010 album The History of Saints by the North Carolina band Vanisher, performing the solo for the song "Oceans."

Mörck provided a guest solo for Australian melodic death metal band Universum on the track, "Sum of the Universe," from their 2011 release Mortuus Machina.

Mörck also provides a guest solo for Australian power metal band Lord on an instrumental song from their 2009 release Set in Stone.

Mörck is married to Cătălina Popa from the German symphonic metal band Haggard. Their Transylvanian marriage was documented into a music video for Amaranthe's track "Endlessly", which was released on 5 March 2020.

Gear/Endorsements 
Guitars
 Caparison Dellinger II FX-WM Charcoal Black with EMG 81/85 pickups
 Custom Caparison Horus 27 frets
 Custom Caparison Dellinger II FX with EMG 81/85 pickups
 Caparison Horus Snow Cloud 27 frets
Amplification
 Randall V2
 Randall XL cabinet RS412XLT
Others
 Elixir and Di Marzio straps
 Korg DT-10 stage tuner
 Providence cables S-102
 BBE Green screamer overdrive
 Elixir Strings (0.10-0.64)
 Dunlop and Caparison picks (2.00 mm)

Discography

Dragonland 
 Storming Across Heaven (Demo) (2000)
 The Battle of the Ivory Plains (2001)
 Holy War (2002)
 Starfall (2004)
 Astronomy (2006)
 Under the Grey Banner (2011)
 The Power of the Nightstar (2022)

Nightrage 
 Wearing a Martyr's Crown (2009)
 Insidious (2011)

Disarmonia Mundi 
 The Isolation Game (2009)

Amaranthe 
Amaranthe (2011)
The Nexus (2013)
Massive Addictive (2014)
Maximalism (2016)
Helix (2018)
Manifest (2020)

EPs 
Leave Everything Behind (2009)

References

External links 
 Dragonland's MySpace profile
 Century Media's website
 Official Nightrage page

1981 births
Living people
Swedish heavy metal guitarists
Nightrage members
21st-century guitarists